Menzo Wheeler House is a historic home located at Chaumont in Jefferson County, New York. It was built in 1860 and is a -story, five-by-five-bay building with a heavy wooden frame on a limestone foundation.

It was listed on the National Register of Historic Places in 1990.

References

Houses on the National Register of Historic Places in New York (state)
Houses completed in 1860
Houses in Jefferson County, New York
National Register of Historic Places in Jefferson County, New York
1860 establishments in New York (state)